Tolai may refer to
 The Tolai language, an Austronesian language of Papua New Guinea
 The Tolai people, the speakers of this language